Rogue Waves is a 1979 album by musician Terry Reid.

Track listing
All tracks composed by Terry Reid except where noted.
 "Ain't No Shadow" – 3:57
 "Baby I Love You" (Phil Spector, Ellie Greenwich, Jeff Barry) – 4:04
 "Stop And Think It Over" – 3:45
 "Rogue Wave" – 5:58
 "Walk Away Renée" (Michael Brown, Bob Calilli, Tony Sansone) – 4:24
 "Believe In The Magic" – 6:49
 "Then I Kissed Her" (Phil Spector, Ellie Greenwich, Jeff Barry) – 4:37
 "Bowangi" – 4:29
 "All I Have To Do Is Dream" (Boudleaux Bryant) – 5:39

Personnel
 Terry Reid – guitar, vocals
 Lee Miles – bass
 Doug Rodrigues – lead guitar
 John Siomos – drums, percussion
 Sterling Smith – organ
 James E. Johnson – organ
 Denise Williams – background vocals
 Dyanne Chandler – background vocals
 Maxinne Willard – background vocals
 Terrence James – string arrangement
 Produced by Chris Kimsey and Terry Reid and recorded at Brother's Studio, Santa Monica
 Mastered by Ted Jensen at Sterling Sound, NYC

References

1979 albums
Terry Reid albums
Albums produced by Chris Kimsey
Capitol Records albums